Thomas Ross (27 February 1946 – 18 May 2017) was a Scottish professional footballer who played as an inside forward in the Football League for Peterborough United and York City, in the Highland League for Ross County and in non-League football for Wigan Athletic and Rossendale United. He holds the Guinness World Record for the fastest time to score a hat-trick.

Ross joined Ross County in 1961, at the age of 15, and scored his first goal for the club in his debut season. During the 1964–65 season, he scored 44 goals, including a record-breaking hat-trick against Nairn County on 28 November 1964, where he scored three goals within a 90-second period. His record was not recognised until April 2004, with the official record being held by Jimmy O'Connor of Dublin side Shelbourne, for his 2m 14s treble against Bohemians on 19 November 1967.

After his playing career ended, Ross managed Tain St Duthus in the 1990s. His sons Stuart and Andrew now form the management team of the club, which was revived in 2016. Ross also worked as a scout for Tottenham Hotspur.

His death was reported on the website of St Duthus FC on 19 May 2017.

References

External links

1946 births
2017 deaths
People from Ross and Cromarty
Scottish footballers
Association football forwards
Lochee United F.C. players
Ross County F.C. players
Peterborough United F.C. players
York City F.C. players
Wigan Athletic F.C. players
Scarborough F.C. players
English Football League players
Place of death missing
Tottenham Hotspur F.C. non-playing staff
Deaths from dementia in Scotland